The identification of the causes of World War I remains controversial. World War I began in the Balkans on July 28, 1914, and hostilities ended on November 11, 1918, leaving 17 million dead and 25 million wounded. Moreover, the Russian Civil War can in many ways be considered a continuation of World War I, as can various other conflicts in the direct aftermath of 1918.

Scholars looking at the long term seek to explain why two rival sets of powers (the German Empire and Austria-Hungary against the Russian Empire, France, the British Empire and later the United States) came into conflict by 1915. They look at such factors as political, territorial and economic competition; militarism, a complex web of alliances and alignments; imperialism, the growth of nationalism; and the power vacuum created by the decline of the Ottoman Empire. Other important long-term or structural factors that are often studied include unresolved territorial disputes, the perceived breakdown of the European balance of power, convoluted and fragmented governance, the arms races of the previous decades, and military planning.

Scholars seeking short-term analysis focus on the summer of 1914 and ask whether the conflict could have been stopped, or instead whether deeper causes made it inevitable. Among the immediate causes were the decisions made by statesmen and generals during the July Crisis, which was triggered by the assassination of Archduke Franz Ferdinand of Austria by the Bosnian Serb nationalist Gavrilo Princip, who had been supported by a nationalist organization in Serbia. The crisis escalated as the conflict between Austria-Hungary and Serbia was joined by their allies Russia, Germany, France, and ultimately Belgium and the United Kingdom. Other factors that came into play during the diplomatic crisis leading up to the war included misperceptions of intent (such as the German belief that Britain would remain neutral), the fatalistic belief that war was inevitable, and the speed with which the crisis escalated, partly due to delays and misunderstandings in diplomatic communications.

The crisis followed a series of diplomatic clashes among the Great Powers (Italy, France, Germany, United Kingdom, Austria-Hungary and Russia) over European and colonial issues in the decades before 1914 that had left tensions high. And the cause of the public clashes can be traced to changes in the balance of power in Europe that had been taking place since 1867.

Consensus on the origins of the war remains elusive, since historians disagree on key factors and place differing emphasis on a variety of factors. That is compounded by historical arguments changing over time, particularly as classified historical archives become available, and as perspectives and ideologies of historians have changed. The deepest division among historians is between those who see Germany and Austria-Hungary as having driven events and those who focus on power dynamics among a wider set of actors and circumstances. Secondary fault lines exist between those who believe that Germany deliberately planned a European war, those who believe that the war was largely unplanned but was still caused principally by Germany and Austria-Hungary taking risks, and those who believe that some or all of the other powers (Russia, France, Serbia, United Kingdom) played a more significant role in causing the war than has been traditionally suggested.

Polarization of Europe, 1887–1914 
In August 1914 The Independent magazine described the assassination of Franz Ferdinand and his wife in June as a "deplorable but relatively insignificant" reason for which

"It may be doubted whether the Archduke [is] worth all this carnage", the magazine added. It discussed and dismissed ethnicity, race, religion, and national interests as motivations for war. The Independent concluded that "such is the ridiculous and tragical situation resulting from the survival of the antiquated superstition of the 'balance of power,' that is, the theory that the prosperity of one nation was an injury to others":

"The only unexpected thing about the present European war is the date of it", the magazine added later that month:

To understand the long-term origins of the war in 1914, it is essential to understand how the powers formed into two competing sets that shared common aims and enemies. Both sets became, by August 1914, Germany and Austria-Hungary on one side and Russia, France, and Britain on the other side.

German realignment to Austria-Hungary and Russian realignment to France, 1887–1892 

In 1887, German and Russian alignment was secured by means of a secret Reinsurance Treaty arranged by Otto von Bismarck. However, in 1890, Bismarck fell from power, and the treaty was allowed to lapse in favor of the Dual Alliance (1879) between Germany and Austria-Hungary. That development was attributed to Count Leo von Caprivi, the Prussian general who replaced Bismarck as chancellor. It is claimed that Caprivi recognized a personal inability to manage the European system as his predecessor had and so was counseled by contemporary figures such as Friedrich von Holstein to follow a more logical approach, as opposed to Bismarck's complex and even duplicitous strategy. Thus, the treaty with Austria-Hungary was concluded despite the Russian willingness to amend the Reinsurance Treaty and to sacrifice a provision referred to as the "very secret additions" that concerned the Turkish Straits.

Caprivi's decision was also driven by the belief that the Reinsurance Treaty was no longer needed to ensure Russian neutrality if France attacked Germany, and the treaty would even preclude an offensive against France. Lacking the capacity for Bismarck's strategic ambiguity, Caprivi pursued a policy that was oriented towards "getting Russia to accept Berlin's promises on good faith and to encourage St. Petersburg to engage in a direct understanding with Vienna, without a written accord." By 1882, the Dual Alliance was expanded to include Italy. In response, Russia secured in the same year the Franco-Russian Alliance, a strong military relationship that was to last until 1917. That move was prompted by Russia's need for an ally since it was experiencing a major famine and a rise in antigovernment revolutionary activities. The alliance was gradually built throughout the years from when Bismarck refused the sale of Russian bonds in Berlin, which drove Russia to the Paris capital market. That began the expansion of Russian and French financial ties, which eventually helped elevate the Franco-Russian entente to the diplomatic and military arenas.

Caprivi's strategy appeared to work when, during the outbreak of the Bosnian crisis of 1908, Germany successfully demanded that Russia step back and demobilize. When Germany asked Russia the same thing later, Russia refused, which finally helped precipitate the war.

French distrust of Germany 

Some of the distant origins of World War I can be seen in the results and consequences of the Franco-Prussian War in 1870 and 1871 and the concurrent unification of Germany. Germany had won decisively and established a powerful empire, but France fell into chaos and experienced a years-long decline in its military power. A legacy of animosity grew between France and Germany after the German annexation of Alsace-Lorraine. The annexation caused widespread resentment in France, giving rise to the desire for revenge that was known as revanchism. French sentiment was based on a desire to avenge military and territorial losses and the displacement of France as the pre-eminent continental military power. Bismarck was wary of the French desire for revenge and achieved peace by isolating France and by balancing the ambitions of Austria-Hungary and Russia in the Balkans. During his later years, he tried to placate the French by encouraging their overseas expansion. However, anti-German sentiment remained.

France eventually recovered from its defeat, paid its war indemnity, and rebuilt its military strength. However, France was smaller than Germany in terms of population and industry and therefore many French felt insecure next to a more powerful neighbor. By the 1890s, the desire for revenge over Alsace-Lorraine was no longer a major factor for the leaders of France but remained a force in public opinion. Jules Cambon, the French ambassador to Berlin (1907–1914), worked hard to secure a détente, but French leaders decided that Berlin was trying to weaken the Triple Entente and was not sincere in seeking peace. The French consensus was that war was inevitable.

British alignment towards France and Russia, 1898–1907: The Triple Entente 

After Bismarck's removal in 1890, French efforts to isolate Germany became successful. With the formation of the informal Triple Entente, Germany began to feel encircled. French Foreign Minister Théophile Delcassé went to great pains to woo Russia and Britain. Key markers were the 1894 Franco-Russian Alliance, the 1904 Entente Cordiale with Britain, and the 1907 Anglo-Russian Convention, which led to the Triple Entente. France's informal alignment with Britain and its formal alliance with Russia against Germany and Austria eventually led Russia and Britain to enter World War I as France's allies.

Britain abandoned its policy of splendid isolation in the 1900s, after it had been isolated during the Second Boer War. Britain concluded agreements, limited to colonial affairs, with its two major colonial rivals: the Entente Cordiale with France in 1904 and the Anglo-Russian Entente in 1907. Some historians see Britain's alignment as principally a reaction to an assertive German foreign policy and the buildup of its navy from 1898 that led to the Anglo-German naval arms race.

Other scholars, most notably Niall Ferguson, argue that Britain chose France and Russia over Germany because Germany was too weak an ally to provide an effective counterbalance to the other powers and could not provide Britain with the imperial security that was achieved by the Entente agreements. In the words of the British diplomat Arthur Nicolson, it was "far more disadvantageous to us to have an unfriendly France and Russia than an unfriendly Germany." Ferguson argues that the British government rejected German alliance overtures "not because Germany began to pose a threat to Britain, but, on the contrary because they realized she did not pose a threat." The impact of the Triple Entente was therefore twofold by improving British relations with France and its ally, Russia, and showing the importance to Britain of good relations with Germany. It was "not that antagonism toward Germany caused its isolation, but rather that the new system itself channeled and intensified hostility towards the German Empire."

The Triple Entente between Britain, France, and Russia is often compared to the Triple Alliance between Germany, Austria–Hungary and Italy, but historians caution against that comparison as simplistic. The Entente, in contrast to the Triple Alliance and the Franco-Russian Alliance, was not an alliance of mutual defence, and so in 1914 Britain felt free to make its own foreign policy decisions. As the British Foreign Office official Eyre Crowe minuted: "The fundamental fact of course is that the Entente is not an alliance. For purposes of ultimate emergencies it may be found to have no substance at all. For the Entente is nothing more than a frame of mind, a view of general policy which is shared by the governments of two countries, but which may be, or become, so vague as to lose all content."

A series of diplomatic incidents between 1905 and 1914 heightened tensions between the Great Powers and reinforced the existing alignments, beginning with the First Moroccan Crisis.

First Moroccan Crisis, 1905–06: Strengthening the Entente 

The First Moroccan Crisis was an international dispute between March 1905 and May 1906 over the status of Morocco. The crisis worsened German relations with both France and Britain, and helped ensure the success of the new Entente Cordiale. In the words of the historian Christopher Clark, "The Anglo-French Entente was strengthened rather than weakened by the German challenge to France in Morocco." Due to this crisis, Spain turned to the United Kingdom and France, and signed the Pact of Cartagena of 1907. Spain received British help to build the new España-class battleship.

Bosnian Crisis, 1908: Worsening relations of Russia and Serbia with Austria-Hungary 

In 1908, Austria-Hungary announced its annexation of Bosnia and Herzegovina, provinces in the Balkans. Bosnia and Herzegovina had been nominally under the sovereignty of the Ottoman Empire but administered by Austria-Hungary since the Congress of Berlin in 1878.  The announcement upset the fragile balance of power in the Balkans and enraged Serbia and pan-Slavic nationalists throughout Europe. The weakened Russia was forced to submit to its humiliation, but its foreign office still viewed Austria-Hungary's actions as overly aggressive and threatening. Russia's response was to encourage pro-Russian and anti-Austrian sentiment in Serbia and other Balkan provinces, provoking Austrian fears of Slavic expansionism in the region.

Agadir crisis in Morocco, 1911

Imperial rivalries pushed France, Germany, and Britain to compete for control of Morocco, leading to a short-lived war scare in 1911. In the end, France established a protectorate over Morocco that increased European tensions. The Agadir Crisis resulted from the deployment of a substantial force of French troops into the interior of Morocco in April 1911. Germany reacted by sending the gunboat SMS Panther to the Moroccan port of Agadir on 1 July 1911. The main result was deeper suspicion between London and Berlin and closer military ties between London and Paris.

British backing of France during the crisis reinforced the Entente between the two countries and with Russia, increased Anglo-German estrangement, and deepened the divisions that would erupt in 1914. In terms of internal British jousting, the crisis was part of a five-year struggle inside the British cabinet between Radical isolationists and the Liberal Party's imperialist interventionists. The interventionists sought to use the Triple Entente to contain German expansion. The Radical isolationists obtained an agreement for official cabinet approval of all initiatives that might lead to war. However, the interventionists were joined by the two leading Radicals, David Lloyd George and Winston Churchill. Lloyd George's famous Mansion House speech of 21 July 1911 angered the Germans and encouraged the French.

The crisis led British Foreign Secretary Edward Grey, a Liberal, and French leaders to make a secret naval agreement by which the Royal Navy would protect the northern coast of France from German attack, and France agreed to concentrate the French Navy in the western Mediterranean and to protect British interests there. France was thus able to guard its communications with its North African colonies, and Britain to concentrate more force in home waters to oppose the German High Seas Fleet. The British cabinet was not informed of the agreement until August 1914. Meanwhile, the episode strengthened the hand of German Admiral Alfred von Tirpitz, who was calling for a greatly-increased navy and obtained it in 1912.

The American historian Raymond James Sontag argues that Agadir was a comedy of errors that became a tragic prelude to the World War I:
The crisis seems comic--its obscure origin, the questions at stake, the conduct of the actors--had comic. The results were tragic. Tension between France and Germany and between Germany and England have been increased; the armaments race receive new impetus; the conviction that an early war was inevitable spread through the governing class of Europe.

Italo-Turkish War: Isolation of the Ottomans, 1911–1912 

In the Italo-Turkish War, the Kingdom of Italy defeated the Ottoman Empire in North Africa in 1911–1912. Italy easily captured the important coastal cities, but its army failed to advance far into the interior. Italy captured the Ottoman Tripolitania Vilayet, a province whose most notable subprovinces, or sanjaks, were Fezzan, Cyrenaica, and Tripoli itself. The territories together formed what was later known as Italian Libya. The main significance for World War I was that it was now clear that no Great Power still appeared to wish to support the Ottoman Empire, which paved the way for the Balkan Wars. Christopher Clark stated, "Italy launched a war of conquest on an African province of the Ottoman Empire, triggering a chain of opportunistic assaults on Ottoman territories across the Balkans. The system of geographical balances that had enabled local conflicts to be contained was swept away."

Balkan Wars, 1912–13: Growth of Serbian and Russian power 

The Balkan Wars were two conflicts that took place in the Balkan Peninsula in southeastern Europe in 1912 and 1913. Four Balkan states defeated the Ottoman Empire in the first war; one of them, Bulgaria, was defeated in the second war. The Ottoman Empire lost nearly all of its territory in Europe. Austria-Hungary, although not a combatant, was weakened, as a much-enlarged Kingdom of Serbia pushed for union of all South Slavs.

The Balkan Wars in 1912–1913 increased international tension between Russia and Austria-Hungary. It also led to a strengthening of Serbia and a weakening of the Ottoman Empire and Bulgaria, which might otherwise have kept Serbia under control, thus disrupting the balance of power in Europe toward Russia.

Russia initially agreed to avoid territorial changes, but later in 1912, it supported Serbia's demand for an Albanian port. The London Conference of 1912–13 agreed to create an independent Albania, but both Serbia and Montenegro refused to comply. After an Austrian and then an international naval demonstration in early 1912 and Russia's withdrawal of support, Serbia backed down. Montenegro was not as compliant, and on May 2, the Austrian council of ministers met and decided to give Montenegro a last chance to comply, or it would resort to military action. However, seeing the Austro-Hungarian military preparations, the Montenegrins requested for the ultimatum to be delayed, and they complied.

The Serbian government, having failed to get Albania, now demanded for the other spoils of the First Balkan War to be reapportioned, and Russia failed to pressure Serbia to back down. Serbia and Greece allied against Bulgaria, which responded with a pre-emptive strike against their forces and so began the Second Balkan War. The Bulgarian army crumbled quickly after the Ottoman Empire and Romania joined the war.

The Balkan Wars strained the German alliance with Austria-Hungary. The attitude of the German government to Austro-Hungarian requests of support against Serbia was initially divided and inconsistent. After the German Imperial War Council of 8 December 1912, it was clear that Germany was not ready to support Austria-Hungary in a war against Serbia and its likely allies.

In addition, German diplomacy before, during, and after the Second Balkan War was pro-Greek and pro-Romanian and against Austria-Hungary's increasing pro-Bulgarian sympathies. The result was tremendous damage to relations between both empires. Austro-Hungarian Foreign Minister Leopold von Berchtold remarked to the German ambassador, Heinrich von Tschirschky in July 1913, "Austria-Hungary might as well belong 'to the other grouping' for all the good Berlin had been."

In September 1913, it was learned that Serbia was moving into Albania, and Russia was doing nothing to restrain it, and the Serbian government would not guarantee to respect Albania's territorial integrity and suggested that some frontier modifications would occur. In October 1913, the council of ministers decided to send Serbia a warning followed by an ultimatum for Germany and Italy to be notified of some action and asked for support and for spies to be sent to report if there was an actual withdrawal. Serbia responded to the warning with defiance, and the ultimatum was dispatched on October 17 and received the following day. It demanded for Serbia to evacuate from Albania within eight days. After Serbia complied, the Kaiser made a congratulatory visit to Vienna to try to fix some of the damage done earlier in the year.

By then, Russia had mostly recovered from its defeat in the Russo-Japanese War, and the calculations of Germany and Austria were driven by a fear that Russia would eventually become too strong to be challenged. The conclusion was that any war with Russia had to occur within the next few years to have any chance of success.

Franco-Russian Alliance changes to Balkan inception scenario, 1911–1913 
The original Franco-Russian alliance was formed to protect both France and Russia from a German attack. In the event of such an attack, both states would mobilize in tandem, placing Germany under the threat of a two-front war. However, there were limits placed on the alliance so that it was essentially defensive in character.

Throughout the 1890s and the 1900s, the French and the Russians made clear the limits of the alliance did not extend to provocations caused by each other's adventurous foreign policy. For example, Russia warned France that the alliance would not operate if the French provoked the Germans in North Africa. Equally, the French insisted that the Russians should not use the alliance to provoke Austria-Hungary or Germany in the Balkans and that France did not recognize in the Balkans a vital strategic interest for France or Russia.

That changed in the last 18 to 24 months before the outbreak of the war. At the end of 1911, particularly during the Balkan Wars in 1912–1913, the French view changed to accept the importance of the Balkans to Russia. Moreover, France clearly stated that if, as a result of a conflict in the Balkans, war broke out between Austria-Hungary and Serbia, France would stand by Russia. Thus, the alliance changed in character and Serbia now became a security salient for Russia and France. A war of Balkan inception, regardless of who started such a war, would cause the alliance would respond by viewing the conflict as a casus foederis, a trigger for the alliance. Christopher Clark described that change as "a very important development in the pre-war system which made the events of 1914 possible."
Otte also agrees that France became significantly less keen on restraining Russia after the Austro-Serbian crisis of 1912, and sought to embolden Russia against Austria. The Russian ambassador conveyed Poincare's message as saying that "if Russia wages war, France also wages war."

Liman von Sanders Affair: 1913-14
This was a crisis caused by the appointment of an Imperial German Army officer, Otto Liman von Sanders, to command the Ottoman First Army Corps guarding Constantinople and the subsequent Russian objections. In November, 1913, Russian Foreign Minister Sergei Sazonov complained to Berlin that the Sanders mission was an "openly hostile act." In addition to threatening Russia's foreign trade, half of which flowed through the Turkish Straits, the mission raised the possibility of a German-led Ottoman assault on Russia's Black Sea ports, and it imperiled Russian plans for expansion in eastern Anatolia.  A compromise arrangement was agreed for Sanders to be appointed to the rather less senior and less influential position of Inspector General in January 1914. When the war came Sanders provided only limited help to the Ottoman forces.

Anglo-German détente, 1912–14 

Historians have cautioned that taken together, the preceding crises should not be seen as an argument that a European war was inevitable in 1914.

Although the Haldane Mission of February 1912 failed to halt the Anglo-German naval arms race, the race suddenly paused in late 1912 as Germany cut its naval budget. In April 1913, Britain and Germany signed an agreement over the African territories of the Portuguese Empire, which was expected to collapse imminently. (That empire lasted into the 1970s.)  Moreover, the Russians were again threatening British interests in Persia and India. The British were "deeply annoyed by St Petersburg's failure to observe the terms of the agreement struck in 1907 and began to feel an arrangement of some kind with Germany might serve as a useful corrective." Despite the infamous 1908 interview in The Daily Telegraph, which implied that Kaiser Wilhelm wanted war, he came to be regarded as a guardian of peace. After the Moroccan Crisis, the Anglo-German press wars, previously an important feature of international politics during the first decade of the century, virtually ceased. In early 1913, H. H. Asquith stated, "Public opinion in both countries seems to point to an intimate and friendly understanding." The end of the naval arms race, the relaxation of colonial rivalries, and the increased diplomatic co-operation in the Balkans all resulted in an improvement in Germany's image in Britain by the eve of the war.

The British diplomat Arthur Nicolson wrote in May 1914, "Since I have been at the Foreign Office I have not seen such calm waters." The Anglophile German Ambassador Karl Max, Prince Lichnowsky, deplored that Germany had acted hastily without waiting for the British offer of mediation in July 1914 to be given a chance.

The July Crisis 
Full article: July Crisis

Assassination of Archduke Franz Ferdinand by Serbian irredentists, 28 June 1914 

On 28 June 1914, Archduke Franz Ferdinand, the heir presumptive to the Austro-Hungarian throne, and his wife, Sophie, Duchess of Hohenberg, are shot dead by two gun shots in Sarajevo by Gavrilo Princip, one of a group of six assassins (five Serbs and one Bosniak) co-ordinated by Danilo Ilić, a Bosnian Serb and a member of the Black Hand secret society.

The assassination is significant because it was perceived by Austria-Hungary as an existential challenge and so was viewed as providing a casus belli with Serbia. Emperor Franz Josef was 84 and so the assassination of his heir, so soon before he was likely to hand over the crown, was seen as a direct challenge to the empire. Many ministers in Austria, especially Berchtold, argue that the act must be avenged. Moreover, the Archduke had been a decisive voice for peace in the previous years but was now removed from the discussions. The assassination triggered the July Crisis, which turned a local conflict into a European and later a world war.

Domestic political factors

German domestic politics 

Left-wing parties, especially the Social Democratic Party of Germany (SPD), made large gains in the 1912 German federal election. The German government was still dominated by the Prussian Junkers, who feared the rise of left-wing parties. Fritz Fischer famously argued that they deliberately sought an external war to distract the population and to whip up patriotic support for the government. Indeed, one German military leader, Moritz von Lynker, the chief of the military cabinet, wanted war in 1909 because it was "desirable in order to escape from difficulties at home and abroad." The Conservative Party leader Ernst von Heydebrand und der Lasa suggested that "a war would strengthen patriarchal order."

Other authors argue that German conservatives were ambivalent about a war for fear that losing a war would have disastrous consequences and believed that even a successful war might alienate the population if it was lengthy or difficult. Scenes of mass "war euphoria" were often doctored for propaganda purposes, and even the scenes which were genuine would not reflect the general population. Many German people complained of a need to conform to the euphoria around them, which allowed later Nazi propagandists to "foster an image of national fulfillment later destroyed by wartime betrayal and subversion culminating in the alleged Dolchstoss (stab in the back) of the army by socialists."

Drivers of Austro-Hungarian policy
The argument that Austria-Hungary was a moribund political entity, whose disappearance was only a matter of time, was deployed by hostile contemporaries to suggest that its efforts to defend its integrity during the last years before the war were, in some sense, illegitimate.

Clark states, "Evaluating the prospects of the Austro-Hungarian empire on the eve of the first world war confronts us in an acute way with the problem of temporal perspective.... The collapse of the empire amid war and defeat in 1918 impressed itself upon the retrospective view of the Habsburg lands, overshadowing the scene with auguries of imminent and ineluctable decline."

It is true that Austro-Hungarian politics in the decades before the war were increasingly dominated by the struggle for national rights among the empire's eleven official nationalities: Germans, Hungarians, Czechs, Slovaks, Slovenes, Croats, Serbs, Romanians, Ruthenians (Ukrainians), Poles, and Italians. However, before 1914, radical nationalists seeking full separation from the empire were still a small minority, and Austria-Hungary's political turbulence was more noisy than deep.

In fact, in the decade before the war, the Habsburg lands passed through a phase of strong widely shared economic growth. Most inhabitants associated the Habsburgs with the benefits of orderly government, public education, welfare, sanitation, the rule of law, and the maintenance of a sophisticated infrastructure.

Christopher Clark states: "Prosperous and relatively well administered, the empire, like its elderly sovereign, exhibited a curious stability amid turmoil. Crises came and went without appearing to threaten the existence of the system as such. The situation was always, as the Viennese journalist Karl Kraus quipped, 'desperate but not serious'."

Jack Levy and William Mulligan argue that the death of Franz Ferdinand itself was a significant factor in helping escalate the July Crisis into a war by killing a powerful proponent for peace and thus encouraged a more belligerent decision-making process.

Drivers of Serbian policy
The principal aims of Serbian policy were to consolidate the Russian-backed expansion of Serbia in the Balkan Wars and to achieve dreams of a Greater Serbia, which included the unification of lands with large ethnic Serb populations in Austria-Hungary, including Bosnia 

Underlying that was a culture of extreme nationalism and a cult of assassination, which romanticized the slaying of the Ottoman Sultan Murad I as the heroic epilogue to the otherwise-disastrous Battle of Kosovo on 28 June 1389. Clark states: "The Greater Serbian vision was not just a question of government policy, however, or even of propaganda. It was woven deeply into the culture and identity of the Serbs." Famed Serbian-American scientist Michael Pupin, for example, in July 1914 explicitly connected the Battle of Kosovo ("a natural heritage of every true Serb") to Franz Ferdinand's assassination. He wrote that the battle's "memory always served as a reminder to the Serbs that they must avenge the wrongs perpetrated upon their race".

Serbian policy was complicated by the fact that the main actors in 1914 were both the official Serb government, led by Nikola Pašić, and the "Black Hand" terrorists, led by the head of Serb military intelligence, known as Apis. The Black Hand believed that a Greater Serbia would be achieved by provoking a war with Austria-Hungary by an act of terror. The war would be won with Russian backing.

The official government position was to focus on consolidating the gains made during the exhausting Balkan War and to avoid further conflicts. That official policy was temporized by the political necessity of simultaneously and clandestinely supporting dreams of a Greater Serbian state in the long term. The Serbian government found it impossible to put an end to the machinations of the Black Hand for fear it would itself be overthrown. Clark states: "Serbian authorities were partly unwilling and partly unable to suppress the irredentist activity that had given rise to the assassinations in the first place".

Russia tended to support Serbia as a fellow Slavic state, considered Serbia its "client," and encouraged Serbia to focus its irredentism against Austria-Hungary because it would discourage conflict between Serbia and Bulgaria, another prospective Russian ally, in Macedonia.

Imperialism

Impact of colonial rivalry and aggression on Europe in 1914

Imperial rivalry and the consequences of the search for imperial security or for imperial expansion had important consequences for the origins of World War I.

Imperial rivalries between France, Britain, Russia and Germany played an important part in the creation of the Triple Entente and the relative isolation of Germany. Imperial opportunism, in the form of the Italian attack on Ottoman Libyan provinces, also encouraged the Balkan wars of 1912–13, which changed the balance of power in the Balkans to the detriment of Austria-Hungary.

Some historians, such as Margaret MacMillan, believe that Germany created its own diplomatic isolation in Europe, in part by an aggressive and pointless imperial policy known as Weltpolitik. Others, such as Clark, believe that German isolation was the unintended consequence of a détente between Britain, France, and Russia. The détente was driven by Britain's desire for imperial security in relation to France in North Africa and to Russia in Persia and India.

Either way, the isolation was important because it left Germany few options but to ally itself more strongly with Austria-Hungary, leading ultimately to unconditional support for Austria-Hungary's punitive war on Serbia during the July Crisis.

German isolation: a consequence of Weltpolitik?
Otto von Bismarck disliked the idea of an overseas empire but supported France's colonization in Africa because it diverted the French government, attention, and resources away from Continental Europe and revanchism after 1870. Germany's "New Course" in foreign affairs, Weltpolitik ("world policy"), was adopted in the 1890s after Bismarck's dismissal.

Its aim was ostensibly to transform Germany into a global power through assertive diplomacy, the acquisition of overseas colonies, and the development of a large navy.

Some historians, notably MacMillan and Hew Strachan, believe that a consequence of the policy of Weltpolitik and Germany's associated assertiveness was to isolate it. Weltpolitik, particularly as expressed in Germany's objections to France's growing influence in Morocco in 1904 and 1907, also helped cement the Triple Entente. The Anglo-German naval race also isolated Germany by reinforcing Britain's preference for agreements with Germany's continental rivals: France and Russia.

German isolation: a consequence of the Triple Entente?
Historians like Ferguson and Clark believe that Germany's isolation was the unintended consequences of the need for Britain to defend its empire against threats from France and Russia. They also downplay the impact of Weltpolitik and the Anglo-German naval race, which ended in 1911.

Britain and France signed a series of agreements in 1904, which became known as the Entente Cordiale. Most importantly, it granted freedom of action to Britain in Egypt and to France in Morocco. Equally, the 1907 Anglo-Russian Convention greatly improved British–Russian relations by solidifying boundaries that identified respective control in Persia, Afghanistan, and Tibet.

The alignment between Britain, France, and Russia became known as the Triple Entente. However, the Triple Entente was not conceived as a counterweight to the Triple Alliance but as a formula to secure imperial security between the three powers. The impact of the Triple Entente was twofold: improving British relations with France and its ally, Russia, and showing the importance to Britain of good relations with Germany. Clark states it was "not that antagonism toward Germany caused its isolation, but rather that the new system itself channeled and intensified hostility towards the German Empire."

Imperial opportunism
The Italo-Turkish War of 1911–1912 was fought between the Ottoman Empire and the Kingdom of Italy in North Africa. The war made it clear that no great power still appeared to wish to support the Ottoman Empire, which paved the way for the Balkan Wars.

The status of Morocco had been guaranteed by international agreement, and when France attempted a great expansion of its influence there without the assent of all other signatories, Germany opposed and prompted the Moroccan Crises: the Tangier Crisis of 1905 and the Agadir Crisis of 1911. The intent of German policy was to drive a wedge between the British and French, but in both cases, it produced the opposite effect and Germany was isolated diplomatically, most notably by lacking the support of Italy despite it being in the Triple Alliance. The French protectorate over Morocco was established officially in 1912.

In 1914, however, the African scene was peaceful. The continent was almost fully divided up by the imperial powers, with only Liberia and Ethiopia still independent. There were no major disputes there pitting any two European powers against each other.

Marxist interpretation

Marxism attributes war to economic interests and rivalries, in this case, imperialism. Vladimir Lenin argued that "imperialism is the monopoly stage of capitalism," which emerges from the "free competition" stage of capitalism and is characterized by the presence of "five basic features":"(1) the concentration of production and capital has developed to such a high stage that it has created monopolies which play a decisive role in economic life; (2) the merging of bank capital with industrial capital, and the creation, on the basis of this 'finance capital,' of a financial oligarchy; (3) the export of capital as distinguished from the export of commodities acquires exceptional importance; (4) the formation of international monopolist capitalist associations which share the world among themselves and (5) the territorial division of the whole world among the biggest capitalist powers is completed."Lenin concluded that these five features of imperialism had been established by the turn of the 20th century, after the great powers had spent the final decades of the prior century acquiring nearly all the remaining territory of the world that had not yet been colonized. The largest and most lucrative uncolonized or semi-colonized territories at the time of the war were that of Persia (Iran), Turkey (including all of the pre-industrial territories of the declining Ottoman Empire), and most of China beyond the treaty ports. Having completed the division of the world among themselves at the beginning of the century, the developed capitalist states would thereafter compete for hegemony in the form of a redivision of those territories, both in the industrialized areas (e.g., "German appetite for Belgium; French appetite for Lorraine"), and in primarily agrarian areas.

In the final analysis, the conflict at the start of the war reflected the present state of that division among the capitalist powers seeking to export their capital abroad. Britain and France, chiefly the former, represented on the one side countries that were the first to industrialize under capitalism and therefore the first to develop monopoly capitalism where the entire economy fell under the domination of a handful of interlinked corporations and financial institutions. This gave them both the ability and, more importantly, the need to acquire colonies: places without industry that would finance their development, primarily via enterprises of raw resource extraction, in British and French banks through taking loans, floating bonds, and selling shares. Britain and France therefore had by far the most colonial territory at the start of the war, but this meant that the development of their domestic industries had slowed considerably, and their national wealth was now predominantly achieved through a return on financial investments (i.e., export of capital) in their colonies rather than through purchase on the global market of their domestically manufactured goods (i.e., export of commodities). Russia, having become highly indebted to France in order to finance its own industrial development, rounds out the major powers of the Triple Entente at the outset of the conflict. On the other side, at the same time that Britain and France had turned to acquiring colonies, Germany's domestic development proceeded rapidly to the point that its output had exceeded that of Britain and France by 1914, but its ability to invest its new surplus of capital was limited by the territorial dominance of the other empires. Austria-Hungary and the Ottoman Empire lagged considerably behind Britain, France, and Germany in their industrial development, and all three of the latter had made footholds exporting their own capital in the territories of the former (Germany financed and developed oil fields in Romania and the railroad under construction from Istanbul to Baghdad; Egypt, though nominally Ottoman territory, had been under British military control since 1882 to secure British and French interests in the Suez Canal). Accordingly, the Balkan crisis, from the point of view of the industrial powers, was predominantly a question of which country's industrial and financial cartels would control the states that emerged from the fledgling national movements there, and therefore reap the profits. Moreover, whoever lost the war would pay an indemnity and therefore have to cede some of its interests to the victor, whether in the form of the loser's directly controlled colonies or in their financial interests in nominally independent states.

Richard Hamilton observed that the argument went that since industrialists and bankers were seeking raw materials, new markets and new investments overseas, if one was strategically blocked by other powers, the "obvious" or "necessary" solution was war.

Hamilton somewhat criticized the view that the war was launched to secure colonies, but agreed that imperialism may have been on the mind of key decision makers. He argued that it was not necessarily for logical, economic reasons. Firstly, the different powers of the war had different imperial holdings. Britain had the largest empire in the world and an historic monopoly on sea-trade in the Royal Navy, Russia had the second largest, and France had a modestly-sized empire. Conversely, Germany had a few unprofitable colonies, and Austria-Hungary had no overseas holdings or desire to secure any.  So, the divergent interests require an "imperialism argument" to be specific in "interests" or "needs" that decision makers would be trying to meet. None of Germany's colonies made more money than was required to maintain them, and they also were only 0.5% of Germany's overseas trade, and only a few thousand Germans migrated to the colonies. However, in economics, the Baghdad railway was not only a potential threat to British control of trade by sea, but direct access to oil so highly preferred over coal would fuel the already large German economy and its growing navy. However, this was recognised as important enough to the British that it was actively and strategically being managed through financing to share rail access, and through diplomacy not to share northern rail access to the Persian Gulf. Thus, he argues that colonies were pursued mainly as a sign of German power and prestige, rather than for profit, which could be got through trade alone. While Russia eagerly pursued colonisation in East Asia by seizing control of Manchuria, it had little gain in wealth; the Manchurian population was never sufficiently integrated into the Russian economy, and efforts to make Manchuria a captive trade market did not end Russia's trade deficit with China. Hamilton argued that the "imperialism argument" depended upon the view of national elites being informed, rational, and calculating, but it is equally possible to consider that decision-makers were uninformed or ignorant. Hamilton suggested that imperial ambitions may have been driven by groupthink - because every other country was doing it, policymakers would think that their country should do the same. Hamilton noted that Bismarck was famously not moved by such peer pressure and ended Germany's limited imperialist movement. He regarded colonial ambitions as a waste of money but simultaneously recommended them to other nations.

Hamilton was more critical of the view that capitalists and business leaders drove the war. He thought that businessmen, bankers, and financiers were generally against the war, as they viewed it as being perilous to economic prosperity. The decision of Austria-Hungary to go to war was made by the monarch, his ministers, and military leaders, with practically no representation from financial and business leaders even though Austria-Hungary was then developing rapidly. Furthermore, evidence can be found from the Austro-Hungarian stock market, which responded to the assassination of Franz Ferdinand with unease but no sense of alarm and only a small decrease in share value. However, when it became clear that war was a possibility, share values dropped sharply, which suggested that investors did not see war as serving their interests. One of the strongest sources of  opposition to the war was from major banks, whose financial bourgeoisie regarded the army as the reserve of the aristocracy and utterly foreign to the banking universe. While the banks had ties to arms manufacturers, it was those companies that had links to the military, not the banks, which were pacifistic and profoundly hostile to the prospect of war. However, the banks were largely excluded from the nation's foreign affairs. Likewise, German business leaders had little influence. Hugo Stinnes, a leading German industrialist, advocated peaceful economic development and believed that Germany would be able to rule Europe by economic power and that war would be a disruptive force. Carl Duisberg, a chemical industrialist, hoped for peace and believed that the war would set German economic development back a decade, as Germany's extraordinary prewar growth had depended upon international trade and interdependence. While some bankers and industrialists tried to curb Wilhelm II away from war, their efforts ended in failure. There is no evidence they ever received a direct response from the Kaiser, chancellor, or foreign secretary or that their advice was discussed in depth by the Foreign Office or the General Staff. The German leadership measured power not in financial ledgers but land and military might. In Britain, the Chancellor of the Exchequer, David Lloyd George, had been informed by the Governor of the Bank of England that business and financial interests opposed British intervention in the war. Lord Nathan Rothschild, a leading British banker, called the financial editor at The Times and insisted for the paper to denounce the war and to advocate for neutrality, but the lead members of the newspaper ultimately decided that the paper should support intervention. The Rothschild family would go on to suffer serious losses in the war that amounted to 23% of its capital. Generally speaking, the European business leaders were in favour of profits and peace allowed for stability and investment opportunities across national borders, but war brought the disruption trade, the confiscation of holdings, and the risk of increased taxation. Even arms manufacturers, the so-called "Merchants of Death," would not necessarily benefit since they could make money selling weapons at home, but they could lose access to foreign markets. Krupp, a major arms manufacturer, started the war with 48 million marks in profits but ended it 148 million marks in debt, and the first year of peace saw further losses of 36 million marks.

William Mulligan argues that while economic and political factors were often interdependent, economic factors tended towards peace. Prewar trade wars and financial rivalries never threatened to escalate into conflict. Governments would mobilise bankers and financiers to serve their interests, rather than the reverse. The commercial and financial elite recognized peace as necessary for economic development and used its influence to resolve diplomatic crises. Economic rivalries existed but were framed largely by political concerns. Prior to the war, there were few signs that the international economy stood for war in the summer of 1914.

Social Darwinism 

Social Darwinism was a theory of human evolution loosely based on Darwinism that influenced most European intellectuals and strategic thinkers from 1870 to 1914. It emphasised that struggle between nations and "races" was natural and that only the fittest nations deserved to survive. It gave an impetus to German assertiveness as a world economic and military power, aimed at competing with France and Britain for world power. German colonial rule in Africa in 1884 to 1914 was an expression of nationalism and moral superiority, which was justified by constructing an image of the natives as "Other." The approach highlighted racist views of mankind. German colonization was characterized by the use of repressive violence in the name of "culture" and "civilisation." Germany's cultural-missionary project boasted that its colonial programmes were humanitarian and educational endeavours. Furthermore, the wide acceptance of Social Darwinism by intellectuals justified Germany's right to acquire colonial territories as a matter of the "survival of the fittest," according to the historian Michael Schubert.

The model suggested an explanation of why some ethnic groups, then called "races," had been for so long antagonistic, such as Germans and Slavs. They were natural rivals, destined to clash. Senior German generals like Helmuth von Moltke the Younger talked in apocalyptic terms about the need for Germans to fight for their existence as a people and culture. MacMillan states: "Reflecting the Social Darwinist theories of the era, many Germans saw Slavs, especially Russia, as the natural opponent of the Teutonic races." Also, the chief of the Austro-Hungarian General Staff declared: "A people that lays down its weapons seals its fate." In July 1914, the Austrian press described Serbia and the South Slavs in terms that owed much to Social Darwinism. In 1914, the German economist Johann Plenge described the war as a clash between the German "ideas of 1914" (duty, order, justice) and the French "ideas of 1789" (liberty, equality, fraternity). William Mulligen argues that Anglo-German antagonism was also about a clash of two political cultures as well as more traditional geopolitical and military concerns. Britain admired Germany for its economic successes and social welfare provision but also regarded Germany as illiberal, militaristic, and technocratic.

War was seen as a natural and viable or even useful instrument of policy. "War was compared to a tonic for a sick patient or a life-saving operation to cut out diseased flesh." Since war was natural for some leaders, it was simply a question of timing and so it would be better to have a war when the circumstances were most propitious. "I consider a war inevitable," declared Moltke in 1912. "The sooner the better." In German ruling circles, war was viewed as the only way to rejuvenate Germany. Russia was viewed as growing stronger every day, and it was believed that Germany had to strike while it still could before it was crushed by Russia.

Nationalism made war a competition between peoples, nations or races, rather than kings and elites. Social Darwinism carried a sense of inevitability to conflict and downplayed the use of diplomacy or international agreements to end warfare. It tended to glorify warfare, the taking of initiative, and the warrior male role.

Social Darwinism played an important role across Europe, but J. Leslie has argued that it played a critical and immediate role in the strategic thinking of some important hawkish members of the Austro-Hungarian government. Social Darwinism, therefore, normalized war as an instrument of policy and justified its use.

Web of alliances 

Although general narratives of the war tend to emphasize the importance of alliances in binding the major powers to act in the event of a crisis such as the July Crisis, historians such as Margaret MacMillan warn against the argument that alliances forced the Great Powers to act as they did: "What we tend to think of as fixed alliances before the First World War were nothing of the sort. They were much more loose, much more porous, much more capable of change."

The most important alliances in Europe required participants to agree to collective defence if they were attacked. Some represented formal alliances, but the Triple Entente represented only a frame of mind:
 German-Austrian Treaty (1879) or Dual Alliance
 The Franco-Russian Alliance (1894)
 The addition of Italy to the Germany and Austrian alliance in 1882, forming the Triple Alliance
 Treaty of London, 1839, guaranteeing the neutrality of Belgium

There are three notable exceptions that demonstrate that alliances did not in themselves force the great powers to act:
 The Entente Cordiale between Britain and France in 1905 included a secret agreement that left the northern coast of France and the English Channel to be defended by the British Royal Navy, and the separate "entente" between Britain and Russia (1907) formed the so-called Triple Entente. However, the Triple Entente did not, in fact, force Britain to mobilise because it was not a military treaty. 
 Moreover, general narratives of the war regularly misstate that Russia was allied to Serbia. Clive Ponting noted: "Russia had no treaty of alliance with Serbia and was under no obligation to support it diplomatically, let alone go to its defence."
 Italy, despite being part of the Triple Alliance, did not enter the war to defend the Triple Alliance partners.

Arms race 
By the 1870s to 1880s, all the major powers were preparing for a large-scale war although none expected one. Britain ignored its small army and focused on building up the Royal Navy, which was already stronger than the next two navies combined. Germany, France, Austria, Italy, Russia, and some smaller countries set up conscription systems in which young men would serve from one to three years in the army and then spend the next twenty years or so in the reserves with annual summer training. Men from higher social statuses became officers. Each country devised a mobilization system in which the reserves could be called up quickly and sent to key points by rail.

Every year, the plans were updated and expanded in terms of complexity. Each country stockpiled arms and supplies for an army that ran into the millions. Germany in 1874 had a regular professional army of 420,000 with an additional 1.3 million reserves. By 1897, the regular army was 545,000 strong and the reserves 3.4 million. The French in 1897 had 3.4 million reservists, Austria 2.6 million, and Russia 4.0 million. The various national war plans had been perfected by 1914 but with Russia and Austria trailing in effectiveness. Recent wars since 1865 had typically been short: a matter of months. All war plans called for a decisive opening and assumed victory would come after a short war. None planned for the food and munitions needs of the long stalemate that actually happened in 1914 to 1918.

As David Stevenson put it, "A self-reinforcing cycle of heightened military preparedness... was an essential element in the conjuncture that led to disaster.... The armaments race... was a necessary precondition for the outbreak of hostilities." David Herrmann goes further by arguing that the fear that "windows of opportunity for victorious wars" were closing, "the arms race did precipitate the First World War." If Franz Ferdinand had been assassinated in 1904 or even in 1911, Herrmann speculates, there might have been no war. It was "the armaments race and the speculation about imminent or preventive wars" that made his death in 1914 the trigger for war.

One of the aims of the First Hague Conference of 1899, held at the suggestion of Tsar Nicholas II, was to discuss disarmament. The Second Hague Conference was held in 1907. All signatories except for Germany supported disarmament. Germany also did not want to agree to binding arbitration and mediation. The Kaiser was concerned that the United States would propose disarmament measures, which he opposed. All parties tried to revise international law to their own advantage.

Anglo-German naval race 

Historians have debated the role of the German naval buildup as the principal cause of deteriorating Anglo-German relations. In any case, Germany never came close to catching up with Britain.

Supported by Wilhelm II's enthusiasm for an expanded German navy, Grand Admiral Alfred von Tirpitz championed four Fleet Acts from 1898 to 1912. From 1902 to 1910, the Royal Navy embarked on its own massive expansion to keep ahead of the Germans. The competition came to focus on the revolutionary new ships based on the Dreadnought, which was launched in 1906 and gave Britain a battleship that far outclassed any other in Europe.

The overwhelming British response proved to Germany that its efforts were unlikely ever to equal the Royal Navy. In 1900, the British had a 3.7:1 tonnage advantage over Germany; in 1910, the ratio was 2.3:1 and in 1914, it was 2.1:1. Ferguson argues, "So decisive was the British victory in the naval arms race that it is hard to regard it as in any meaningful sense a cause of the First World War." That ignored the fact that the Kaiserliche Marine had narrowed the gap by nearly half and that the Royal Navy had long intended to be stronger than any two potential opponents combined. The US Navy was in a period of growth, which made the German gains very ominous.

In Britain in 1913, there was intense internal debate about new ships because of the growing influence of John Fisher's ideas and increasing financial constraints. In 1914, Germany adopted a policy of building submarines, instead of new dreadnoughts and destroyers, effectively abandoning the race, but it kept the new policy secret to delay other powers from following suit.

Russian interests in Balkans and Ottoman Empire 
The main Russian goals included strengthening its role as the protector of Eastern Christians in the Balkans, such as in Serbia. Although Russia enjoyed a booming economy, growing population, and large armed forces, its strategic position was threatened by an expanding Ottoman military trained by German experts that was using the latest technology. The start of the war renewed attention of old goals: expelling the Ottomans from Constantinople, extending Russian dominion into eastern Anatolia and Persian Azerbaijan, and annexing Galicia. The conquests would assure the Russian predominance in the Black Sea and access to the Mediterranean.

Technical and military factors

Short-war illusion
Traditional narratives of the war suggested that when the war began, both sides believed that the war would end quickly. Rhetorically speaking, there was an expectation that the war would be "over by Christmas" in 1914. That is important for the origins of the conflict since it suggests that since it was expected that the war would be short, statesmen tended not to take gravity of military action as seriously as they might have done so otherwise. Modern historians suggest a nuanced approach. There is ample evidence to suggest that statesmen and military leaders thought the war would be lengthy and terrible and have profound political consequences.

While it is true all military leaders planned for a swift victory, many military and civilian  leaders recognized that the war might be long and highly destructive. The principal German and French military leaders, including Moltke, Ludendorff, and Joffre, expected a long war.  British Secretary of State for War Lord Kitchener expected a long war: "three years" or longer, he told an amazed colleague.

Moltke hoped that if a European war broke out, it would be resolved swiftly, but he also conceded that it might drag on for years, wreaking immeasurable ruin.  Asquith wrote of the approach of "Armageddon" and French and Russian generals spoke of a "war of extermination" and the "end of civilization." British Foreign Secretary Edward Grey famously stated just hours before Britain declared war, "The lamps are going out all over Europe, we shall not see them lit again in our lifetime."

Clark concluded, "In the minds of many statesmen, the hope for a short war and the fear of a long one seemed to have cancelled each other out, holding at bay a fuller appreciation of the risks."

Primacy of offensive and war by timetable 

Moltke, Joffre, Conrad, and other military commanders held that seizing the initiative was extremely important. That theory encouraged all belligerents to devise war plans to strike first to gain the advantage. The war plans all included complex plans for mobilization of the armed forces, either as a prelude to war or as a deterrent. The continental Great Powers' mobilization plans included arming and transporting millions of men and their equipment, typically by rail and to strict schedules,

The mobilization plans limited the scope of diplomacy, as military planners wanted to begin mobilisation as quickly as possible to avoid being caught on the defensive. They also put pressure on policymakers to begin their own mobilization once it was discovered that other nations had begun to mobilize.

In 1969, A. J. P. Taylor wrote that mobilization schedules were so rigid that once they were begun, they could not be canceled without massive disruption of the country and military disorganisation, and they could not proceed without physical invasion (of Belgium by Germany). Thus, diplomatic overtures conducted after the mobilizations had begun were ignored. Hence the metaphor "war by timetable."

Russia ordered a partial mobilization on 25 July against Austria-Hungary only. Their lack of prewar planning for the partial mobilization made the Russians realize by 29 July that it would be impossible to interfere with a general mobilization.

Only a general mobilization could be carried out successfully. The Russians were, therefore, faced with only two options: canceling the mobilization during a crisis or moving to full mobilization, the latter of which they did on 30 July. They, therefore, mobilized along both the Russian border with Austria-Hungary and the border with Germany.

German mobilization plans assumed a two-front war against France and Russia and had the bulk of the German army massed against France and taking the offensive in the west, and a smaller force holding East Prussia. The plans were based on the assumption that France would mobilize significantly faster than Russia.

On 28 July, Germany learned through its spy network that Russia had implemented partial mobilisation and its "Period Preparatory to War." The Germans assumed that Russia had  decided upon war and that its mobilisation put Germany in danger, especially since because German war plans, the so-called Schlieffen Plan, relied upon Germany to mobilise speedily enough to defeat France first by attacking largely through neutral Belgium before it turned to defeat the slower-moving Russians.

Christopher Clark states: "German efforts at mediation – which suggested that Austria should 'Halt in Belgrade' and use the occupation of the Serbian capital to ensure its terms were met – were rendered futile by the speed of Russian preparations, which threatened to force the Germans to take counter-measures before mediation could begin to take effect."

Clark also states: "The Germans declared war on Russia before the Russians declared war on Germany. But by the time that happened, the Russian government had been moving troops and equipment to the German front for a week. The Russians were the first great power to issue an order of general mobilisation and the first Russo-German clash took place on German, not on Russian soil, following the Russian invasion of East Prussia. That doesn't mean that the Russians should be 'blamed' for the outbreak of war. Rather it alerts us to the complexity of the events that brought war about and the limitations of any thesis that focuses on the culpability of one actor."

Historiography 

Immediately after the end of hostilities, Anglo-American historians argued that Germany was solely responsible for the start of the war. However, academic work in the English-speaking world in the late 1920s and the 1930s blamed the participants more equally.

The historian Fritz Fischer unleashed an intense worldwide debate in the 1960s on Germany's long-term goals. The American historian Paul Schroeder agrees with the critics that Fisher exaggerated and misinterpreted many points. However, Schroeder endorses Fisher's basic conclusion:

However, Schroeder argues that all of that was not the main cause of the war in 1914. Indeed, the search for a single main cause is not a helpful approach to history. Instead, there are multiple causes any one or two of which could have launched the war. He argues, "The fact that so many plausible explanations for the outbreak of the war have been advanced over the years indicates on the one hand that it was massively overdetermined, and on the other that no effort to analyze the causal factors involved can ever fully succeed."

Debate over the country that "started" the war and who bears the blame still continues.
According to Annika Mombauer, a new consensus among scholars had emerged by the 1980s, mainly as a result of Fischer's intervention:

On historians inside Germany, she adds, "There was 'a far-reaching consensus about the special responsibility of the German Reich' in the writings of leading historians, though they differed in how they weighted Germany's role."

See also 

 Historiography of the causes of World War I
 Diplomatic history of World War I
 American entry into World War I
 Austro-Hungarian entry into World War I
 British entry into World War I
 French entry into World War I
 German entry into World War I
 Italian entry into World War I
 Japanese entry into World War I
 Ottoman entry into World War I
 Russian entry into World War I
 History of the Balkans
 International relations (1814–1919)
 Anglo-German naval arms race
 Causes of World War II

References

Sources

Further reading 

 Albertini, Luigi. The Origins of the War of 1914 (3 vol 1952). vol 2 online covers July 1914
 Albrecht-Carrié, René. A Diplomatic History of Europe Since the Congress of Vienna (1958), 736pp; a basic introduction, 1815–1955 online free to borrow
 Anderson Frank Maloy, and Amos Shartle Hershey.  Handbook for the diplomatic history of Europe, Asia, and Africa, 1870-1914 (1918) detailed coverage of all major diplomatic events and many minor one online
 ; revisionist (argues that Germany was certainly not guilty)
 Beatty, Kack. The Lost History of 1914: The Year the Great War Began (2012) looks at major powers and argues war was not inevitable. excerpt
 Brandenburg, Erich. (1927) From Bismarck to the World War: A History of German Foreign Policy 1870-1914 (1927) online.
 Brose, Eric. "Arms Race prior to 1914, Armament Policy," in: 1914-1918-online. International Encyclopedia of the First World War (Freie Universität Berlin, Berlin 2014-10-08). DOI: 10.15463/ie1418.10219. online
 Carroll, E. Malcolm, French Public Opinion and Foreign Affairs 1870-1914 (1931).  online
 Carroll, E. Malcolm. Germany and the great powers, 1866-1914: A study in public opinion and foreign policy (1938) online;  online 
 
 Clark, Christopher. Sleepwalkers: How Europe Went to War in 1914 (2012), major comprehensive overview
 Sleepwalkers lecture by Clark. online
  essays by scholars from both sides
 
 
 
 Gooch, G.P. History of modern Europe, 1878-1919 (2nd ed. 1956) pp 386–413.  online, diplomatic history
 Gooch, G.P. Before the war: studies in diplomacy (2 vol 1936, 1938) online long scholarly chapters on Britain's Landsdowne; France's Théophile Delcassé; Germany's Bernhard von Bülow pp 187–284; Russia's Alexander Izvolsky 285–365; and Austria' Aehrenthal pp 366–438. vol 2: Grey, 1–133; Poincaré, 135–200; Bethmann Hollweg, 201–85; Sazonoff, 287–369; Berchtold, 371–447. vol 2 online
 Hamilton, Richard F. and Holger H. Herwig, eds. Decisions for War, 1914-1917 (2004), scholarly essays on Serbia, Austria-Hungary, Germany, Russia, France, Britain, Japan, Ottoman Empire, Italy, the United States, Bulgaria, Romania, and Greece. excerpt
 
 Herwig, Holger H. and Neil Heyman. Biographical Dictionary of World War I (1982)
 Hewitson, Mark. "Germany and France before the First World War: a reassessment of Wilhelmine foreign policy." English Historical Review 115.462 (2000): 570–606; argues Germany had a growing sense of military superiority.
 Hewitson, Mark. Germany and the Causes of the First World War (2004) online 
 
 
 
 Kapp, Richard W. "Divided Loyalties: The German Reich and Austria-Hungary in Austro-German Discussions of War Aims, 1914–1916." Central European History 17.2-3 (1984): 120–139.
 Karpat, Kemal H. "The entry of the Ottoman empire into World War I." Belleten 68.253 (2004): 1-40. online
 
 
 , scholarly articles; no primary sources included
 Keiger, John F.V. France and the origins of the First World War (Macmillan, 1983) summary.
 
 
  readings from multiple points of view
 
  all three volumes combined
 
 
 ; major scholarly overview
 Massie, Robert K. Dreadnought: Britain, Germany, and the coming of the Great War (Random House, 1991) excerpt see Dreadnought (book), popular history
 
 
 
 
  role of public opinion
 
 Otte, T. G. July Crisis: The World's Descent into War, Summer 1914 (Cambridge University Press, 2014). online review
 
 
 Ritter, Gerhard. The Sword and the Scepter: The Problem of Militarism in Germany: volume 2: The European powers and the Wilhelminian Empire, 1890-1914 (1970) online, chapters on the army role in politics in France, Britain, Russia, Austria-Hungary and especially Germany
 Seligmann, Matthew S. "Failing to Prepare for the Great War? The Absence of Grand Strategy in British War Planning before 1914" War in History (2017) 24#4 414–37.
 
 Spender, J.A. Fifty years of Europe: a study in pre-war documents (1933) covers 1871 to 1914, 438pp
 Stavrianos, L.S.  The Balkans Since 1453 (1958), major scholarly history; online free to borrow
 
  major reinterpretation
 
  a major scholarly synthesis
 Taylor, A.J.P. The Struggle for Mastery in Europe 1848–1918 (1954) online free
 
 
 Zametica, John. Folly and malice: the Habsburg empire, the Balkans and the start of World War One (London:  Shepheard–Walwyn, 2017).  416pp.

Historiography 

 Bresciani, Marco. "From 'East to West', the 'world crisis' of 1905-1920: a re-reading of Elie Halévy." First World War Studies 9.3 (2018): 275–295.
 
 Cornelissen, Christoph, and Arndt Weinrich, eds. Writing the Great War - The Historiography of World War I from 1918 to the Present (2020) free download; full coverage for major countries.
 
 Evans, R. J. W. "The Greatest Catastrophe the World Has Seen"   The New York Review of Books Feb 6, 2014   online
 
 
 Horne, John, ed. A Companion to World War I (2012) 38 topics essays by scholars; emphasis on historiography.
 
 
 
 
 
 Levy, Jack S., and John A. Vasquez, eds. The Outbreak of the First World War: Structure, Politics, and Decision-Making (Cambridge UP,  2014).
 Lieber, Keir A. "The new history of World War I and what it means for international relations theory." International Security 32.2 (2007): 155–191. online
 
 
 Mombauer, Annika. The origins of the First World War: controversies and consensus. (2002)
 
 
 
 
 
 
 
 Sked, Alan. "Austria-Hungary and the First World War." Histoire Politique 1 (2014): 16–49. online free
 
 
 Trachtenberg, Marc. "The Meaning of Mobilization in 1914" International Security 15#3 (1991) pp. 120–150 online
 Vasquez, John A. "The First World War and International Relations Theory: A Review of Books on the 100th Anniversary." International Studies Review 16#4 (2014): 623–644.
 
 Williamson Jr, Samuel R., and Ernest R. May. "An identity of opinion: Historians and July 1914." Journal of Modern History 79.2 (2007): 335–387. online

Primary sources 

 Collins, Ross F. ed.  World War I: Primary Documents on Events from 1914 to 1919 (2007) excerpt and text search
 Dugdale, E.T.S. ed.  German Diplomatic Documents 1871-1914  (4 vol 1928–31), in English translation. online
 French Ministry of Foreign Affairs, The French Yellow Book: Diplomatic Documents (1914)
 Gooch, G. P. Recent Revelations of European Diplomacy (1940); 475pp detailed summaries of memoirs from all the major belligerents
 Gooch, G.P. and Harold Temperley, eds. British documents on the origins of the war, 1898-1914 (11 vol. ) online
 v. i The end of British isolation—v.2. From the occupation of Kiao-Chau to the making of the Anglo-French entente Dec. 1897-Apr. 1904—V.3. The testing of the Entente, 1904-6 -- v.4. The Anglo-Russian rapprochment, 1903-7 -- v.5. The Near East, 1903-9 -- v.6. Anglo-German tension. Armaments and negotiation, 1907-12—v.7. The Agadir crisis—v.8. Arbitration, neutrality and security—v.9. The Balkan wars, pt.1-2 -- v.10,pt.1. The Near and Middle East on the eve of war. pt.2. The last years of peace—v.11. The outbreak of war V.3. The testing of the Entente, 1904-6 -- v.4. The Anglo-Russian rapprochment, 1903-7 -- v.5. The Near East, 1903-9 -- v.6. Anglo-German tension. Armaments and negotiation, 1907-12—v.7. The Agadir crisis—v.8. Arbitration, neutrality and security—v.9. The Balkan wars, pt.1-2 -- v.10,pt.1. The Near and Middle East on the eve of war. pt.2. The last years of peace—v.11. The outbreak of war.
 Gooch, G. P. and Harold Temperley, eds. British Documents on the Origins of the War 1898-1914 Volume XI, the Outbreak of War Foreign Office Documents (1926) online
 Gooch, G.P. Recent revelations of European diplomacy (1928) pp 269–330. online; summarizes new documents from Germany, pp 3–100; Austria, 103–17; Russia, 161–211; Serbia and the Balkans, 215–42; France, 269–330; Great Britain, 343–429;  United States, 433–62.
 Hammond's frontier atlas of the world war : containing large scale maps of all the battle fronts of Europe and Asia, together with a military map of the United States (1916) online free
 Lowe, C.J. and M.L. Dockrill, eds. The Mirage of Power: The Documents of British Foreign Policy 1914-22 (vol 3, 1972), pp 423–759
 Mombauer, Annika. The Origins of the First World War: Diplomatic and Military Documents (2013), 592pp;
 Reichstag speeches

External links 

 Mombauer, Annika: July Crisis 1914, in: 1914-1918-online. International Encyclopedia of the First World War.
 Mulligan, William: The Historiography of the Origins of the First World War, in: 1914-1918-online. International Encyclopedia of the First World War.
 Williamson, Jr., Samuel R.: The Way to War, in: 1914-1918-online. International Encyclopedia of the First World War.
 Brose, Eric: Arms Race prior to 1914, Armament Policy, in: 1914-1918-online. International Encyclopedia of the First World War.
 Peter Geiss: Controversy: The Media's Responsibility for Crises and Conflicts in the Age of Imperialism, in: 1914-1918-online. International Encyclopedia of the First World War.
 Overview of Causes and Primary Sources
 Russia – Getting Too Strong for Germany  by Norman Stone
 The Origins of World War One: An article by Dr. Gary Sheffield at the BBC History site.
 What caused World War I: Timeline of events and origins of WWI
 Kuliabin A. Semine S. Some of aspects of state national economy evolution in the system of the international economic order.- USSR ACADEMY OF SCIENCES FAR EAST DIVISION INSTITUTE FOR ECONOMIC & INTERNATIONAL OCEAN STUDIES Vladivostok, 1991
 The Evidence in the Case: A Discussion of the Moral Responsibility for the War of 1914, as Disclosed by the Diplomatic Records of England, Germany, Russia by James M. Beck
 Concept Map of the Causes of WWI
 'World War One and 100 Years of Counter-Revolution' by Mark Kosman (on the domestic causes of war)

 
World War I